The 2016 Durand Cup Final was the final match of the 128th edition of the Durand Cup, a football competition in India. The match was held on 11 September 2016 at the Ambedkar Stadium in Delhi.

Match

References

External links
 Durand Cup website .

Durand Cup finals
2016 domestic association football cups
2016–17 in Indian football